The A.B. Chace Rowhouses is a historic apartment building located at 655-685 Middle Street in Fall River, Massachusetts. It was constructed circa 1877 for Arnold B. Chace, son of Elizabeth Buffum Chace, a prominent Rhode Island abolitionist and reformer.

The red brick rowhouse is unusual for Fall River, which is more typically dominated by triple-decker houses. (A smaller rowhouse complex is on lower Broadway, at the foot of Columbia St.) The Chace Rowhouse is located along the perimeter of Kennedy Park, not far from the historic St. Anne's Church complex.

See also
National Register of Historic Places listings in Fall River, Massachusetts

References

Apartment buildings on the National Register of Historic Places in Massachusetts
Houses completed in 1877
Houses in Fall River, Massachusetts
National Register of Historic Places in Fall River, Massachusetts
1877 establishments in Massachusetts